Open Bank is a Korean American bank based in California and offers commercial banking services. It currently has nine branches located in California and one branch in Texas, four loan production offices - two located in Washington, one in Colorado, one in Georgia, and a home loan center in Los Angeles. It is one of five major Korean-American banks in the United States.

History
The bank was established on June 10, 2005 as First Standard Bank as a California state-chartered bank headquartered in Los Angeles, California. The bank changed its name to Open Bank in October 2010. In March 2018, the bank announced the launch of its initial public offering of common stock by offering 2,000,000 shares. The initial public offering was priced between $9.50 and $11.50 per share. Min Kim, chief executive officer of the bank, rang the closing bell at the NASDAQ on April 6, 2018.

Overview
The bank promotes itself as a "faith-based" community bank focusing on relationship banking between its customers and community. The bank offers many different services and products to its customers in California. It generates certificates of deposit, installment accounts, money market accounts, retirement accounts, demand and time deposits, and savings accounts, as well as various personal and business checking accounts. The company also provides commercial lending products, including business line of credit, business term loans, and commercial real estate term loans; trade financing products and services comprising issuance of letters of credit, import and export financing, revolving lines of credit, clean and documentary collections, and others; small and medium-sized business administration lending products; and home mortgage financial solutions. In addition, it offers online banking, mobile banking, bill pay, debit and credit card, safe deposit boxes, transfer, cash management, and e-statement services.

References

Companies listed on the Nasdaq
Banks established in 2005
Banks based in California
Companies based in Los Angeles
Korean-American culture in Los Angeles
Korean American banks